The Eastern Orthodox Church has a presence in Germany. With up to 2 million adherents, the Church is Germany's third-largest Christian denomination after Roman Catholicism and the Evangelical Church in Germany (EKD). It has grown due to immigration from Eastern Europe, especially Romania, Greece, the former Soviet Union, and the former Yugoslavia.

Eastern Orthodox jurisdictions in Germany 

 Ecumenical Patriarchate of Constantinople
Metropolitan of Germany
 Patriarchate of Antioch
Archdiocese of Western and Central Europe
 Patriarchate of Moscow
 Diocese of Berlin and Germany
 Diocese of Berlin and Germany (ROCOR)
 Serbian Orthodox Church
Serbian Orthodox Eparchy of Frankfurt and all of Germany
 Romanian Orthodox Church
Metropolis of Germany and Central Europe
 Bulgarian Orthodox Church
Bulgarian Orthodox Eparchy of Central and Western Europe
 Georgian Orthodox Church
Georgian Orthodox Diocese of Western Europe
 Macedonian Orthodox Church
Macedonian Orthodox Diocese of Europe

Educational facilities 
Institute of Orthodox Theology was founded in 1995 at the University of Munich.

Ecumenism 
Some Orthodox churches have been working since 1974 in the Council of Christian Churches in Germany (ACK). The five Orthodox churches have represented for several years in a joint delegation. Likewise, The Orthodox churches are involved in most regional and local working group of the ACK.

There are also bilateral relation with the German Bishops' Conference and the Evangelical Church in Germany (EKD) with discussions on theological issues. For example, several documents were adopted in 2006 to dogmatic questions in a joint working group of the Greek Orthodox Metropolis of Germany and the German Bishops' Conference. As of 2007, this working group has been redesigned and extended.

German Orthodox Church 
For ecclesiological and historical reasons, there is no "German Orthodox Church." In 1990, the German Orthodox Holy Trinity Monastery in Bodenwerder founded the first German Orthodox monastery which, although being ecclesiastically independent, was under the spiritual protection of the Bulgarian Orthodox Church.

Interdenominational organization 
 The Eastern Orthodox Episcopal Conference of Germany (Orthodoxe Bischofskonferenz in Deutschland), established in February 2010, includes 10 diocesan bishops and 7 vicar bishops. It covers about 1.5 million Eastern Orthodox Christians living in Germany. The President of the Conference, in accordance with the order of the Diptychs, the representative of the Ecumenical Patriarchate of Constantinople, is the Metropolitan of Germany Augustinos (Labardakis).
 Orthodoxe Fraternität in Deutschland
 Orthodoxer Jugendbund Deutschland, youth federation

References

Sources 
  Athanasios Basdekis: Die Orthodoxe Kirche. 2003,

External links 
 Greek Orthodox Metropolis of Germany
 Greek Orthodox Patriarchate of Antioch: Germany and Central Europe